Poland competed at the 2022 World Athletics Championships in Eugene, United States from 15 to 24 July 2022. Poland entered 45 athletes.

Medalists

Results

Men
Track and road events

Field events

Women 
Track and road events

* – Indicates the athlete competed in preliminaries but not the final

Field events

Combined events – Heptathlon

Mixed 
Track and road events

* – Indicates the athlete competed in preliminaries but not the final

References

Poland
World Championships in Athletics
2022